Resurrection Mary is a well-known Chicago area ghost story, or urban legend, of the "vanishing hitchhiker" type, a type of folklore that is known in many cultures. According to the story, the ghost resides in Resurrection Cemetery in Justice, Illinois, a few miles southwest of Chicago. Resurrection Mary is considered to be Chicago's most famous ghost.

Since the 1930s, several men driving northeast along Archer Avenue between the Willowbrook Ballroom and Resurrection Cemetery have reported picking up a young female hitchhiker. This young woman is dressed somewhat formally in a white party dress and is said to have light blond hair and blue eyes. There are other reports that she wears a thin shawl, dancing shoes, carries a small clutch purse, and possibly that she is very quiet. As the driver nears Resurrection Cemetery, she disappears into it. According to the Chicago Tribune, "full-time ghost hunter" Richard Crowe has collected "three dozen ... substantiated" reports of Mary from the 1930s to the present.

The legend

The story goes that Mary had spent the evening dancing with a boyfriend at the Oh Henry Ballroom. At some point, they got into an argument and Mary stormed out. She left the ballroom and started walking up Archer Avenue.

She had not gotten very far when she was struck and killed by a hit-and-run driver, who fled the scene leaving Mary to die. Her parents found her and were grief-stricken at the sight of her dead body. They buried her in Resurrection Cemetery, wearing a beautiful white dancing dress and matching dancing shoes. The hit-and-run driver was never found.

Reported sightings
Jerry Palus, a Chicago southsider, reported that in 1939 he met a person whom he came to believe was Resurrection Mary at the Liberty Grove and Hall at 47th and Mozart (and not the Oh Henry/Willowbrook Ballroom). They danced and even kissed and she asked him to drive her home along Archer Avenue, exiting the car and disappearing in front of Resurrection Cemetery.

In 1973, Resurrection Mary was said to have shown up at Harlow's nightclub, on Cicero Avenue on Chicago's southwest side. That same year, a cab driver came into Chet's Melody Lounge, across the street from Resurrection Cemetery, to inquire about a young lady who had left without paying her fare.

There were said to be sightings in 1976, 1978, 1980, and 1989, which involved cars striking, or nearly striking, Mary outside Resurrection Cemetery.  Mary disappears, however, by the time the motorist exits the car.

She also reportedly burned her handprints into the wrought iron fence around the cemetery, in August 1976, although officials at the cemetery have stated that a truck had damaged the fence and that there is no evidence of a ghost.

In a January 31, 1979 article in the Suburban Trib, columnist Bill Geist detailed the story of a cab driver, Ralph, who picked up a young woman – "a looker. A blond. ... she was young enough to be my daughter — 21 tops" – near a small shopping center on Archer Avenue.

Geist described Ralph as "not an idiot or a maniac" but rather, in Ralph's own words, "a typical 52-year-old working guy, a veteran, father, Little League baseball coach, churchgoer, the whole shot".  Geist goes on to say: "The simple explanation, Ralph, is that you picked up the Chicago area's preeminent ghost: Resurrection Mary."

Identity of Mary

Some researchers have attempted to link Resurrection Mary to one of the many thousands of burials in Resurrection Cemetery. A particular focus of these efforts has been Mary Bregovy, who died in 1934, although her death came in an automobile accident in the downtown Chicago Loop. In 1999, Chicago author Ursula Bielski documented a possible connection to Anna "Marija" Norkus, who died in a 1927 auto accident while on her way home from the Oh Henry Ballroom, a theory that has gained popularity in recent years.

In popular culture
The bluegrass band The Country Gentlemen included a song entitled "Bringing Mary Home" on their  1966 album of the same name. In it, the singer picks up a "little girl" named Mary who directs him to a house rather than the cemetery, though she vanishes from his car in the same manner as Resurrection Mary. The driver explains the situation to the home's owner, who tells him that Mary died in a car accident thirteen years before and that he is not the first person to give her a ride home. This version has been covered many times, including versions by Red Sovine and Mac Wiseman.

On his 1996 album The Artful Dodger, singer/songwriter Ian Hunter included the song "Resurrection Mary", in which a driver in or near Chicago picks up a beautiful young woman with an "incandescent glow" who says to him "I'm tryin' to get to Heaven; can you tell me where that is?"

Three films titled Resurrection Mary and based on the legend have been released: one in 2002 starring Wilford Brimley, one in 2005 featuring Joe Estevez and one in 2007. All three films portray Mary as a sinister or vengeful spirit.

The legend of Resurrection Mary was featured twice on Unsolved Mysteries: once in Episode 2 of Season 3, in a segment titled "Resurrection Mary," in 1990, and once on Episode 15 of Season 6, in a segment titled "One for the Road," in 1994.

References

Further reading
 Taylor, Troy. Haunted Illinois: Ghosts and Strange Phenomena of the Prairie State. Mechanicsburg, PA: Stackpole Books, 2008.
 Holub, Joan. The Haunted States of America ... : Haunted Houses and Spooky Places in All 50 States ... and Canada, too!. New York, NY: Scholastic Books, 2001.
 Kaczmarek, Dale. Windy City Ghosts, Ghost Research Society Press, 2005.

American ghosts
Culture of Chicago
Hitchhiking
Illinois folklore